Jorge Alonso Martín (born 5 January 1985) is a Spanish footballer who plays as a midfielder.

He amassed Segunda División totals of 144 matches and 11 goals during eight seasons, representing in the competition Salamanca, Hércules, Valladolid and Racing de Santander. He also played professionally in Israel, India and the Dominican Republic.

Club career
Born in Salamanca, Castile and León, Alonso studied civil engineering at the Polytechnic School of Zamora. After Real Zaragoza expressed desire to sign him for its youth system, he eventually started playing with local UD Salamanca in 2004, appearing in only one Segunda División game in his first season, which ended in relegation; he became a regular in the following years.

Alonso joined Hércules CF on a two-year contract in June 2009, being the first player signed by the club during the off-season. In July of the following year, however, he moved to fellow league side Real Valladolid after agreeing to a three-year deal. He scored his first goal for the latter on 8 September, his 7th-minute penalty ousting SD Huesca from the Copa del Rey and helping to reach the fourth round after the 1–0 home win; the following month, he netted in the last minute to help beat RC Celta de Vigo 3–2 also at the Estadio Nuevo José Zorrilla, exciting manager Antonio Gómez.

However, with his playing time getting limited, Alonso terminated his contract in August 2012. He signed for Racing de Santander the following month.

After suffering relegation from the second level, Alonso joined Segunda División B's CD Leganés for one year. He left in December 2013, moving to the Israeli Premier League with Bnei Sakhnin FC.

In early January 2015, news circulated that third-tier club CD Guijuelo was looking to hire Alonso. He started training on the 9th, and played his first match 16 days later in a 0–1 home loss to SD Compostela.

In November 2015, Alonso joined a host of compatriots at Indian Super League franchise Atlético de Kolkata as a replacement for the injured Javi Lara. After being an unused substitute in the match against Chennaiyin FC, he made his debut in a 4–0 win over FC Goa, replacing fellow Spaniard Jaime Gavilán for the last 12 minutes.

Alonso returned to both his homeland and Salamanca in late December 2017, signing with amateurs Unionistas de Salamanca CF from the Dominican Republic's CA San Cristóbal.

Personal life
Alonso's younger brother, José Ángel, was also a footballer. A defender, he too came through Salamanca's youth ranks.

Club statistics

References

External links
Unionistas official profile 

1985 births
Living people
Sportspeople from Salamanca
Spanish footballers
Footballers from Castile and León
Association football midfielders
Segunda División players
Segunda División B players
Tercera División players
UD Salamanca players
Hércules CF players
Real Valladolid players
Racing de Santander players
CD Leganés players
CD Guijuelo footballers
Unionistas de Salamanca CF players
Israeli Premier League players
Bnei Sakhnin F.C. players
Indian Super League players
ATK (football club) players
Liga Dominicana de Fútbol players
Spain youth international footballers
Spanish expatriate footballers
Expatriate footballers in Israel
Expatriate footballers in India
Expatriate footballers in the Dominican Republic
Spanish expatriate sportspeople in Israel
Spanish expatriate sportspeople in India
Spanish expatriate sportspeople in the Dominican Republic
CA San Cristóbal players